Smash & Scatteration is an album by guitarists Vernon Reid and Bill Frisell which was originally released on the Minor Music in 1985 before being rereleased on CD on Rykodisc.

Reception

The AllMusic review by Scott Yanow called it a "hectic and passionate set of duets" awarding the album 3 stars stating "Although this set has some quieter moments, the nine group originals are generally pretty intense and full of personality".

The authors of The Penguin Guide to Jazz Recordings wrote: "The joke here, of course, is that the quiet guy in the specs is the crazy one while Reid... is the one who holds the whole schtick together with his big but surprisingly accommodating chords."

Author Gene Santoro stated that Frisell and Reid "deconstruct guitar-duo music from the 1920s on," and noted that "the insightful, often hilarious results are grounded in knowledge and understanding."

Nick Deriso, writing for Something Else!, called the album "A memorably offbeat mashup," and commented: "There are hints of both guitarists' future successes in Americana and metal, but... neither Frisell nor Reid stick to their scripted roles — something that might be a challenge to fans of either's later work... Through the sheer force of their combined energy and delight, however, much of it works, anyway."

Track listing
All compositions by Bill Frisell except where noted
 "Landscapes in Alternative History" (Vernon Reid) – 4:27
 "Size 10½ Sneaks" – 3:10
 "Amarillo, Barbados" – 2:49
 "Last Nights of Paris" (Reid) – 3:04
 "Burden of Dreams" (Reid) – 6:35
 "Dark Skin" (Reid) –	5:27
 "Fr, Fr, Frisell" – 4:10
 "Small Hands" – 4:12
 "Black Light" – 7:06

Personnel
Bill Frisell – acoustic guitar, electric guitar, prepared guitar, guitar synthesizer, synthesizer, electronic drums, effects
Vernon Reid – electric guitar guitar synthesizer, banjo, synthesizer, electronic drums

References 

1985 albums
Bill Frisell albums
Vernon Reid albums
Rykodisc albums